Minister for the Environment of Denmark is the politically appointed head of the Danish Ministry of the Environment, and a member of the Cabinet. The ministry and the ministerial position was created in 1971. From 1971 to 1973, the ministry was named the "Ministry of Pollution Combating".

List of Ministers for the Environment

References
Danish Governments – From Folketinget.

External links
Danish Ministry of the Environment – Official webpage.

Environment
Environment